The Gander Bay Causeway was built in 1968 at a cost of $1,350,000. Located in the narrow section of Gander Bay, Newfoundland, Canada, it connects the communities of Clarke's Head and George's Point within the community of Gander Bay South. As a section of Route 331, the causeway became the eastern access to the town of Gander for the residents of Lewisporte and surrounding communities.

Citations

Sources

Books

Online

Causeways
Newfoundland and Labrador provincial highways